Başiskele is a district in Kocaeli Province and a sub-municipality of Kocaeli Metropolitan Municipality in the Marmara region of Turkey. The mayor is Hüseyin Ayaz (AKP).

History 

Başiskele is a relatively new district, constituted in 2008. The municipality of Başiskele, which covers the whole area of the district, is a merger of the former independent municipalities of Kullar, Yeniköy, Bahçecik, Karşıyaka (before named Döngel) and Yuvacık. The name "Baş İskele" (Head Quay") was previously the name of a neighborhood close to the coast of the Sea of Marmara that was already known by that name in the 16th century.

References

External links 
 District governor's site

Populated places in Kocaeli Province
Districts of Kocaeli Province